Monteiro is a municipality in Paraíba, Brazil.

Monteiro may also refer to:

Animals
Monteiro's bushshrike
Monteiro's hornbill
Monteiro's storm petrel

Places
Gabriel Monteiro, a municipality in São Paulo
Jerônimo Monteiro, a municipality in Espírito Santo
Monteiro Lobato, São Paulo, a municipality in São Paulo

Other uses
 Monteiro (surname)

See also
Montero (name), the Spanish version of this surname